Jörn is a locality situated in Skellefteå Municipality, Västerbotten County, Sweden with 797 inhabitants in 2010. Vladimir Lenin made his last stop in Sweden at the railway station in Jörn during his return from exile in 1917.

References 

Populated places in Västerbotten County
Populated places in Skellefteå Municipality